William Francis Burke Jr. was a Fire Captain with the Fire Department of New York, who died during the September 11 attacks in 2001. Burke died when he chose to stay with stranded civilians, which his colleagues believe he knew would cost him his life. Burke was also the only member of Engine 21 who died on 9/11.

The September 11 attacks
On September 11, 2001, Burke, the son of a former Deputy Fire Chief, was with his company, Engine 21, inside the North Tower of the World Trade Center, when he encountered, in Stairwell C, Ed Beyea, a man in a wheelchair he realized could not be evacuated before the building collapsed. Abe Zelmanowitz, a friend of the man, had chosen to stay with him. Burke ordered his men out of the building, while he remained with the two men. Beyea and Zelmanowitz's remains were located together, but Burke's remains were never found.

Fellow Fire Captain Jay Jonas had been with Burke at 9:59a.m., when they felt their tower shake, as the neighboring South Tower collapsed. He described how they agreed this meant the collapse of their tower was imminent.

Fire Lieutenant Gregg Hansson met Burke for the first time the morning of the attack, and was the last surviving person to see Burke. He has described realizing Burke's decision saved his life.  He believed Burke knew the building's collapse was imminent and knew he was sacrificing his own life.

Legacy
Burke's brother Michael organized an annual climb of One World Trade Center, the replacement for the World Trade Center towers, in memory of Burke and his colleagues.

In honor of his sacrifice, the January 17, 2002 episode of the NBC sitcom Friends pays tribute to Captain Burke by having Joey wearing a shirt with "Engine 21" and his name, as Captain Burke was in charge of that station on the day of the September 11 attacks.

References

External links
 

Firefighters
1955 births
2001 deaths
Emergency workers killed in the September 11 attacks
New York City firefighters